All In is a 2003 South Korean television drama series that aired on SBS from 15 January to 3 April 2003, on Wednesdays and Thursdays at 21:55 (KST) for 24 episodes. Inspired by the life of professional poker player Jimmy Cha, it starred Lee Byung-hun and Song Hye-kyo in a story about one's man's rise through the fiercely competitive world of casino gambling as he clashes with his rivals over money, success, and love.

The drama was a ratings success in South Korea, with its final episode reaching a peak viewership rating of 47.7%, which is the 42nd highest-rated Korean drama episode of all time. It also won several awards, notably the Grand Prize ("Daesang") for Lee Byung-hun at the 2003 SBS Drama Awards.

Synopsis
Orphaned then taken in by his gambler uncle, Kim In-ha (Jin Goo) often hangs out with his friends in the basement of a movie theater. He unexpectedly befriends Choi Jung-won, a model student and the rich son of the theater owner. In-ha and Jung-won both fall for Min Su-yeon (Han Ji-min), the daughter of the projectionist at the theater.

When Su-yeon's father was killed by loan sharks, In-ha and Jung-won hatch a plan to avenge Su-yeon by setting fire to a gangster's hideout. But the fire spreads, accidentally killing the gang leader. In-ha is sentenced to seven years, while thanks to his family connections, Jung-won avoids jail time. As In-ha serves his sentence, Jung-won goes to the United States to study and Su-yeon decides to become a nun.

Seven years pass, and by pure chance, the three all end up working at the same casino. In-ha (Lee Byung-hun) and Su-yeon (Song Hye-kyo) fall in love, but are later separated when In-ha is forced to illegally immigrate to the U.S. He finds a job as a mafia hitman, and by a stroke of luck, again meets Su-yeon, and the two plan to get married. However, on their supposed wedding day, In-ha suffers a near-fatal gunshot wound and becomes comatose for 8 months. Unaware that In-ha is alive, the grieving Su-yeon returns to Korea.

In-ha eventually recovers, but Jung-won (Ji Sung) intervenes, saying that he is unworthy to love Su-yeon. In-ha decides to turn his life of misery around and becomes a professional gambler. He meets a business partner and, betting everything he has, returns to Korea to win back Su-yeon's love.

Cast

Main
Lee Byung-hun as Kim In-ha
Jin Goo as young In-ha
Song Hye-kyo as Min Su-yeon / Sister Angela
Han Ji-min as young Su-yeon
Ji Sung as Choi Jung-won
Go Dong-hyeon as young Jung-won
Park Sol-mi as Seo Jin-hee
Shin Ah as young Jin-hee

Supporting
Lee Deok-hwa as Choi Do-hwan, Jung-won's father
Sunwoo Eun-sook as Yoon Hye-sun, Jung-won's mother
Im Hyun-sik as Kim Chi-soo, In-ha's uncle
Park Won-sook as Jang Hyun-ja
Jo Kyung-hwan as Chairman Seo Seung-don, Jin-hee's father
Kim Tae-yeon as Jenny
Huh Joon-ho as Yoo Jong-gu, In-ha's friend from prison
Choi Jung-won as Yoo Jung-ae, Hyun-ja's daughter
Choi Joon-yong as Park Tae-joon, In-ha's hometown friend who became a detective
Yoon Gi-won as Woo Yong-tae, In-ha's hometown friend who became a waiter
Baek Seung-hyeon as Yang Shi-bong, In-ha's hometown friend who is crippled
Jung Yoo-seok as Im Dae-soo ("Shorty")
Jung Ho-bin as Jung Joon-il
Park Jung-woo as Jjagoo
Im Dae-ho as Chun Sang-gu
Yoon Seo-hyun as Man-soo
Hong Yeo-jin as bar hostess
Cho Yeon-woo as yakuza
Kim Byung-se as Michael Jang
Yuko Fueki as Rie Ochida
Kim Hee-jung as office clerk
Park Sang-myun as Im Dae-chi, gang boss
Kim Ha-kyun as Director Son
Choi Ran as Manager Jang Mi-ran
Park Joon-hee as Jo Jung-min
Gi Ju-bong as Bae Sang-doo

Awards 
2003 39th Baeksang Arts Awards
Grand Prize (Daesang) for TV – All In
Best Actor for TV – Lee Byung-hun

2003 SBS Drama Awards
Grand Prize (Daesang) – Lee Byung-hun
Top Excellence Award, Actress – Song Hye-kyo
Excellence Award, Actor – Ji Sung
Best Supporting Actor – Heo Joon-ho
Top 10 Stars – Lee Byung-hun, Song Hye-kyo

Regional broadcast
 It first aired in Japan on cable channel KNTV from 8 March to 25 May 2003. Re-airings followed on terrestrial channel NHK once a week starting 16 April 2004. According to a poll conducted by TV Asahi variety show SMAP Station in May 2007, All In ranked as the seventh most popular Korean drama in Japan.
 In Thailand, it first aired on Channel 3 from 1 April to 24 June 2006. In Mongolia, it first aired on TV9 in 2006.

See also
List of South Korean television series
Culture of South Korea

References

External links
  
 
 

Seoul Broadcasting System television dramas
2003 South Korean television series debuts
2003 South Korean television series endings
Korean-language television shows
South Korean romance television series
South Korean action television series
Television series by Chorokbaem Media
Television shows written by Choi Wan-kyu